Val d'Enfer, is a valley cut into the rock by water erosion. It is located near the village of Les Baux-de-Provence in Provence south eastern France and it takes its name from the strangeness of its white limestone rock formations.

References

Landforms of Bouches-du-Rhône
Valleys of France
Landforms of Provence-Alpes-Côte d'Azur